Ntare Guma Mbaho Mwine (born 1967) is an American stage and film actor, playwright, photographer and documentarian. He was credited by the short form Ntare Mwine through to his 2008 appearances in The Riches, and has been credited with his full name thereafter.

Background
Mwine was born in Hanover, New Hampshire to Ugandan parents in 1967. His father was a Harvard Law School-educated attorney. His parents separated when Ntare was 7, with Ntare spending time with his father (who was then working in finance in the United States, including a period at the World Bank in Washington D.C.) and his mother (who went to Kenya to teach psychology at the University of Nairobi).

Mwine earned a master's degree in Fine Arts from New York University's Graduate Acting Program at the Tisch School of the Arts, graduating in 1992. He also studied at the University of Virginia, the Moscow Arts Theatre, and the Royal National Theatre in London. Basing himself in Los Angeles, Mwine's first professional job was the role of Paul in the 1992 U.S. National Tour of Six Degrees of Separation, for which he received an NAACP Image Award nomination for Best Actor.

Mwine has also expressed his views on sticky subjects including LGBTQ , HIV/AIDS explaining: "I’m an artist. [I] have to tell stories".

Television and film
Mwine has appeared in movies including Blood Diamond, where he made his film debut. His first appearance in television was in New York Undercover in 1995. Recent appearances include a recurring role as the mysterious Usutu in Heroes. Mwine originally had the role of Joseph in the unaired pilot episode of the show; this part was removed when NBC took on the show full-time, due to the character's plot revolving around terrorist activity. Mwine also appeared as Tom Adler in CSI: Crime Scene Investigation and as Maurice Devereaux in The Riches.

Mwine played a minor, yet recurring, character in HBO and David Simon's television series Treme. The series deals with life in the Tremé district of New Orleans after Hurricane Katrina.

In 2018, Mwine featured as Ronnie in the Showtime television series The Chi, which follows residents of the Chicago South Side.

On April 5, 2021, Mwine joined the cast of the Netflix series The Lincoln Lawyer with Manuel Garcia-Rulfo as Mickey Haller. Mwine stars as Detective Raymond Griggs, a character created specifically for the series based on the novel The Brass Verdict.

Photography
Mwine's photographic work has been displayed at the United Nations, The Latino Art Museum in Pomona, California, UCLA's Fowler Museum of Cultural History, and other museums worldwide. It was a central focus of Biro, and prominently featured on Six Feet Under. His photography has also appeared in Vanity Fair.

Stage
Mwine began appearing in stage productions in 1992, appearing as the con man posing as Sidney Poitier's son in Six Degrees of Separation, and in The Riddles Of Race, Circa '68 in 1994, In 1992 and 1997, Mwine was nominated for a Helen Hayes Award for Outstanding Lead Actor in a Non-Resident Production, for his role in Six Degrees of Separation at the National Theatre and Nomathemba at the Kennedy Center in Washington, D.C. He played Julius Van George in Scent of the Roses at the Seattle Contemporary Theatre in 1998.

Mwine's first effort as a playwright, a barestage one-man show entitled Biro, about a HIV-positive Ugandan former rebel soldier who enters the United States illegally for treatment. The play, depicting a 90-minute explanation from the eponymous character to his lawyer about how he came to be in a Texas jail, premiered in early 2003 at Uganda's National Theatre. It later showed at the Joseph Papp Public Theater in New York, as well as in Los Angeles, Seattle, London, and throughout Africa. Mwine performed the work for multiple African heads of state and then-UN General Secretary Kofi Annan in 2004. The Seattle Post-Intelligencer described his performance as "radiant", particularly so given the dark subject matter.

Documentary work
Basing on the article by Bryan Morel Publications at (https://www.bryanmorel.com/),
Mwine's inaugural documentary, Beware of Time was screened at the 2004 Pan African Film Festival in Los Angeles and the Black International Cinema in Berlin. Describing the lives of HIV-positive Ugandans, it was named the Best Film on Matters Relating to Marginalized People, and features a rare interview with Amule Amin, brother of former Ugandan dictator Idi Amin.

Selected filmography

See also 
List of Bishop's College School alumni

References

External links
 
 www.bewareoftime.com — Beware of Time official site
 www.gumadesign.com — Photography work
  Bryan Morel Publications, East African biographers and Wikipedians

American people of Ugandan descent
American dramatists and playwrights
Male actors from New Hampshire
Tisch School of the Arts alumni
Bishop's College School alumni
HIV/AIDS activists
Living people
1967 births
American male stage actors